On August 26, 1825, before the first session of the 19th Congress began, James Allison, Jr. (J) of  resigned.  A special election was held to fill the resulting vacancy.

Election results

Orr took his seat on December 5, 1825, at the start of the First Session of the 19th Congress.

See also
List of special elections to the United States House of Representatives

References

Pennsylvania 1825 16
Pennsylvania 1825 16
1825 16
Pennsylvania 16
United States House of Representatives 16
United States House of Representatives 1825 16